The 2003 Judgment Day was the fifth Judgment Day professional wrestling pay-per-view (PPV) event produced by World Wrestling Entertainment (WWE). It was held for wrestlers from the promotion's Raw and SmackDown! brand divisions. The event took place on May 18, 2003, at the Charlotte Coliseum in Charlotte, North Carolina. This event is notable in the fact that is the last non-Big Four pay-per-view that was not brand-exclusive until Backlash 2007.

Eight professional wrestling matches were scheduled for the event which featured a supercard, a scheduling of more than one main bout. The first main match was from the SmackDown! brand, which was the card's main event, and featured WWE Champion Brock Lesnar defeating Big Show in a Stretcher match to retain the title after Rey Mysterio interfered, attacking Big Show. The second main match was from the Raw brand and was between Kevin Nash and World Heavyweight Champion Triple H, where Nash won by disqualification. Three other championship matches were featured on the undercard. The first match featured Raw's WWE Women's Champion Jazz defeat Victoria, Jacqueline, and Trish Stratus in a Fatal Four-Way match to retain the title. The next was a Battle Royal for the revived Intercontinental Championship on Raw, which Christian won. The final was between the team of Eddie Guerrero and Tajiri and Team Angle (Charlie Haas and Shelton Benjamin) in a ladder match for SmackDown's WWE Tag Team Championship, which Guerrero and Tajiri won.

Production

Background
Judgment Day was first held by World Wrestling Entertainment (WWE) as the 25th In Your House pay-per-view (PPV) in October 1998. It then returned in May 2000 as its own event, establishing Judgment Day as the promotion's annual May PPV. The 2003 event was the fifth event in the Judgment Day chronology and was held on May 18 at the Charlotte Coliseum in Charlotte, North Carolina. It featured wrestlers from the Raw and SmackDown! brands.

Storylines
The event featured nine professional wrestling matches with outcomes predetermined by WWE script writers. The matches featured wrestlers portraying their characters in planned storylines that took place before, during and after the event. All wrestlers were from either one of the WWE's brands – SmackDown! or Raw – the two storyline divisions in which WWE assigned its employees.

The main feud heading into Judgment Day on the SmackDown! brand was between Brock Lesnar and Big Show, with the two feuding over the WWE Championship. At Backlash, Big Show defeated Rey Mysterio and then attacked him as he was strapped onto a stretcher. On the May 1 episode of SmackDown!, Lesnar confronted Big Show about it while Big Show refused to face him. On the May 8 episode of SmackDown!, Big Show was set to team up with A-Train against Chris Benoit and Brock Lesnar, as Lesnar challenged Big Show to a Stretcher match at Judgment Day for the WWE Championship. The FBI then locked Lesnar in his locker room as Big Show and A-Train defeated Benoit. Big Show tried to injure Benoit as he did to Mysterio but Lesnar saved him, only to get chokeslammed by Big Show. On the May 15 episode of SmackDown!, Big Show took Mysterio during an interview out to the ring to attack him once again, but Lesnar ran out and saved Mysterio.

The main feud on the Raw brand was between Triple H and Kevin Nash, with the two feuding over the World Heavyweight Championship. On the April 28 episode of Raw, Triple H and Ric Flair challenged Rob Van Dam and Kane for the World Tag Team Championship. Nash interfered wielding a sledgehammer and then chased Triple H out of the arena, as Triple H sped off in his car after Nash smashed in some of the car's windows. On the May 5 episode of Raw, both Nash and Triple H were guests of the Highlight Reel, Chris Jericho's talk show. Both men brawled all over the arena. Raw Co-General Managers Stone Cold Steve Austin and Eric Bischoff announced a World Heavyweight Championship match between Nash and Triple H at Judgment Day. On the May 12 episode of Raw, Nash fought against Jericho, and won after Shawn Michaels prevented Triple H and Flair from interfering. Nash then hit Triple H with the Jackknife Powerbomb.

The secondary feud on the SmackDown! brand was between Mr. America (Hulk Hogan) and Roddy Piper. After Hogan won against Vince McMahon at WrestleMania XIX, McMahon was so frustrated with him and wanted Hulkamania to die, he indefinitely suspended Hogan and forced him to sit out the rest of his contract. For weeks after that, mysterious Mr. America promos began airing for weeks during SmackDown! shows. On the May 1 episode of SmackDown!, Mr. America debuted on a Piper's Pit segment. McMahon appeared and claimed that Mr. America was Hulk Hogan in disguise; Mr. America fired back by saying, "I am not Hulk Hogan, brother!" (lampooning Hogan's use of "brother" in his promos). McMahon couldn't fire Mr. America due to his contract with Stephanie McMahon. On the May 8 episode of SmackDown!, McMahon said that he would prove that Mr. America was Hulk Hogan in order to fire him. He interviewed Hogan live via satellite from his home, but then was informed that Mr. America was in the building. Vince tried to rip the mask off Mr. America's face but Mr. America laid him out. On the May 15 episode of SmackDown!, Piper challenged Mr. America to a match at Judgment Day, but then Piper attacked Mr. America and his fan. Piper then pulled the prosthetic leg off the fan, who was revealed as Zach Gowen.

Event

Sunday Night Heat
Before the event aired live on pay-per-view, The Hurricane defeated Steven Richards in a dark match.

Preliminary matches 
In the first match, John Cena and The F.B.I. (Chuck Palumbo and Johnny Stamboli) (with Nunzio) faced Rhyno, Spanky, and Chris Benoit. In the end, Benoit applied the Crippler Crossface on Cena, distracting the referee, whilst Palumbo and Stamboli performed the Kiss of Death on Spanky. Palumbo pinned Spanky to win.

In the second match, Test and Scott Steiner (with Stacy Keibler) faced La Résistance (Sylvain Grenier and René Duprée). Test accidentally performed a Big Boot on Steiner, allowing Grenier and Dupree to perform the Bonsoir on Steiner. Dupree pinned Steiner to win.

In the third match, Eddie Guerrero and Tajiri faced Team Angle (Charlie Haas and Shelton Benjamin) in a ladder match for the WWE Tag Team Championship. After a back-and-forth match, Guerrero performed a Frog Splash off a ladder on Benjamin. Haas climbed a ladder but Guerrero performed a Sunset Flip Powerbomb on Haas off the ladder. Benjamin tried to prevent Guerrero from retrieving the title belts but Tajiri spat Green Mist at Benjamin, causing Benjamin to fall off the ladder. Guerrero retrieved the belts to win the match.

In the fourth match, Christian, Val Venis, Chris Jericho, Lance Storm, Test, Rob Van Dam, Kane, Goldust, and Booker T fought in a Battle royal for the vacant and revived WWE Intercontinental Championship. Kane eliminated Storm. Other wrestlers eliminated Kane, leading to Kane re-entering the ring and performing Chokeslams on Venis, Test and Van Dam. Booker T eliminated Test. Goldust eliminated Venis. Jericho eliminated Van Dam after a Springboard Dropkick. Goldust performed Shattered Dreams on Jericho and Christian but Booker T eliminated Goldust. Jericho and Christian double-teamed Booker T before Jericho attempted a Lionsault on Booker T but Christian eliminated Jericho. Christian knocked down a referee with a Baseball Slide and Booker T performed a Superkick on Christian to eliminate Christian but the elimination wasn't seen. Christian attacked Pat Patterson and hit Booker T with the belt. Christian eliminated Booker to win the match and the title. 

In the fifth match, Torrie Wilson faced Sable in a Bikini Contest, which was hosted by Tazz. After taking a poll from the audience, Tazz declared Wilson the winner. Afterwards, Wilson kissed Sable.

In the fifth match, Mr. America (with Zach Gowen) faced Roddy Piper (with Sean O'Haire). Vince McMahon interfered in the match, giving O'Haire a steel pipe. O'Haire attempted to hit Hogan with the pipe but Hogan avoided O'Haire, causing O'Haire to hit Piper with the Pipe. Hogan pinned Piper after an Atomic Leg Drop to win the match.

Main event matches 
In the sixth match, Triple H (with Ric Flair) faced Kevin Nash (with Shawn Michaels) for the World Heavyweight Championship. Before the match, Michaels and Flair fought into the backstage area. Triple H accidentally knocked down the referee with a Clothesline, allowing Triple H to attack Nash with a low blow. Triple H drove Nash into an exposed turnbuckle and performed a Pedigree on Nash for a near-fall. Triple H hit the referee Earl Hebner with the sledgehammer and was disqualified but retained the title. After the match, Nash performed a Big Boot and Jacknife Powerbomb on Triple H. Nash attacked Flair and performed a Jacknife Powerbomb on Triple H through an announce table.

The seventh match was a Fatal 4-Way match for the WWE Women's Championship between Jazz (with Theodore Long), Victoria (with Steven Richards), Jacqueline, and Trish Stratus. Jazz pinned Jacqueline after a DDT to win the match and retain the title.

In the main event Brock Lesnar faced Big Show in a Stretcher match for the WWE Championship. Early in the match, Lesnar used the body board as a weapon on Big Show. Big Show performed a Chokeslam on Lesnar and a Leg Drop on Lesnar, who was laid on the Body Board. After pushing Big Show onto a Stretcher, Lesnar went backstage. Rey Mysterio interfered, performing a 619 on Big Show. Big Show performed a Clothesline on Mysterio before Lesnar drove a forklift out. Lesnar dove off the forklift onto Big Show then performed an F5 on Big Show, allowing Lesnar to place Big Show on a stretcher. Lesnar used the forklift to drive Big Show across the yellow line to win the match and retain the title.

Aftermath
While the 2003 Judgment Day featured wrestlers from both Raw and SmackDown!, the following year's event was made SmackDown!-exclusive. This 2003 event would also be the final event to not be brand-exclusive, not including the "Big Four" PPVs (Royal Rumble, WrestleMania, SummerSlam, and Survivor Series) until Backlash in 2007.

Results

Battle royal

References

External links
Official website

2013 in North Carolina
2003
Events in Charlotte, North Carolina
Professional wrestling in Charlotte, North Carolina
2003 WWE pay-per-view events
May 2003 events in the United States

es:WWE Judgment Day#2003
fr:WWE Judgment Day#2003